Maja Kokervhake is a mountain in northern Albania, in the Accursed Mountains range.

References

Mountains of Albania
Accursed Mountains